The 1960 World Chess Championship was played between Mikhail Botvinnik and Mikhail Tal in Moscow from March 15 to May 7, 1960. Botvinnik was the reigning champion, after winning the World Chess Championship 1958, while Tal qualified by winning the Candidates tournament. Tal won by a margin of 4 points.

1958 Interzonal tournament

An interzonal chess tournament was held in Portorož, SR Slovenia, SFR Yugoslavia, in August and September 1958. The top six finishers qualified for the Candidates Tournament.

Before the final round, the leaders were: (1st) Tal 13; (2nd-3rd) Gligoric, Petrosian 12½ (though Petrosian had the bye in the last round); (4th) Benko 12; (5th-6th) Fischer, Bronstein 11½; (7th-10th) Olafsson, Averbakh, Szabo, Pachman 11. In the final round Fischer had black against Gligoric; while Bronstein, Olafsson, Szabo and Pachman had relatively weaker opponents. Feeling he was forced to play for a win, Fischer played the risky but double-edged Goteborg variation of the Sicilian Najdorf. Later, while the Gligoric-Fischer game was in a critical position with Fischer having some advantage, Fischer saw that Bronstein was unexpectedly losing to Cardoso. So Fischer accepted a draw, qualifying for the Candidates. Of the players on 11 points, only Olafsson won, joining Fischer in the last two qualifying positions.

{| class="wikitable"
|+ 1958 Interzonal Tournament
|-
!  !! !! 1 !! 2 !! 3 !! 4 !! 5 !! 6 !! 7 !! 8 !! 9 !! 10 !! 11 !! 12 !! 13 !! 14 !! 15 !! 16 !! 17 !! 18 !! 19 !! 20 !! 21 !! Total
|- style="background:#ccffcc;"
| 1 || align=left| || x || ½ || ½ || 1 || ½ || ½ || ½ || ½ || 0 || 1 || ½ || 1 || 1 || ½ || ½ || 1 || ½ || 1 || ½ || 1 || 1 || 13½
|- style="background:#ccffcc;"
| 2 || align=left| || ½ || x || ½ || ½ || 0 || ½ || ½ || ½ || ½ || ½ || 1 || 1 || ½ || ½ || 1 || 1 || 0 || 1 || 1 || 1 || 1 || 13
|- style="background:#ccffcc;"
| 3 || align=left| || ½ || ½ || x || ½ || ½ || ½ || ½ || ½ || 1 || ½ || 1 || ½ || ½ || ½ || ½ || 0 || 1 || 1 || 1 || ½ || 1 || 12½
|- style="background:#ccffcc;"
| 4 || Pal Benko (stateless) || 0 || ½ || ½ || x || ½ || 1 || ½ || 1 || 1 || ½ || ½ || 0 || ½ || 1 || ½ || ½ || ½ || ½ || 1 || 1 || 1 || 12½
|- style="background:#ccffcc;"
| 5 || align=left| ||½ ||1 ||½ ||½ ||x ||1 ||0 ||1 ||½ ||1 ||½ ||½ ||½ ||½ ||0 ||1 ||0 ||0 ||1 ||1 ||1 || 12
|- style="background:#ccffcc;"
| 6 || align=left| || ½ || ½ || ½ || 0 || 0 || x || ½ || ½ || ½ || ½ || ½ || ½ || ½ || 1 || ½ || 1 || 1 || ½ || 1 || 1 || 1 || 12
|-
| 7 || align=left| || ½ || ½ || ½ || ½ || 1 || ½ || x || ½ || ½ || ½ || 1 || ½ || ½ || ½ || ½ || ½ || 1 || ½ || 0 || ½ || 1 || 11½
|-
| 8 || align=left| ||½ ||½ ||½ ||0 ||0 ||½ || ½ || x ||1 ||0 ||½ ||½ ||½ ||1 ||1 ||1 ||½ ||1 ||½ ||½ ||1 ||11½
|-
| 9 || align=left| ||1 ||½ ||0 ||0 ||½ ||½ ||½ ||0 ||x ||1 ||½ ||½ ||½ ||½ ||½ ||1 ||1 ||½ ||1 ||½ ||1 ||11½
|-
| 10 || align=left| ||0 ||½ ||½ ||½ ||0 ||½ ||½ ||1 ||0 ||x ||½ ||½ ||1 ||½ ||0 ||½ ||1 ||1 ||1 ||1 ||1 ||11½
|-
| 11 || align=left| ||½ ||0 ||0 ||½ ||½ ||½ ||0 ||½ ||½ ||½ ||x ||½ ||½ ||½ ||1 ||1 ||1 ||½ ||1 ||1 ||1 ||11½
|-
| 12 ||  ||0 ||0 ||½ ||1 ||½ ||½ ||½ ||½ ||½ ||½ ||½ ||x  ||½ ||1 ||½ ||½ ||1 ||½ ||1 ||½ ||½ ||11
|-
| 13 || align=left| ||0 ||½ ||½ ||½ ||½ ||½ ||½ ||½ ||½ ||0 ||½ ||½ ||x ||½ ||1 ||½ ||½ ||½ ||1 ||1 ||1 ||11
|-
| 14 ||  ||½ ||½ ||½ ||0 ||½ ||0 ||½ ||0 ||½ ||½ ||½ ||0 ||½ ||x ||1 ||½ ||1 ||1 ||½ ||1 ||½ ||10
|-
| 15 ||  ||½ ||0 ||½ ||½ ||1 ||½ ||½ ||0 ||½ ||1 ||0 ||½ ||0 ||0 ||x ||0 ||½ ||1 ||1 ||½ ||1 ||9½
|-
| 16 ||  ||0 ||0 ||1 ||½ ||0 ||0 ||½ ||0 ||0 ||½ ||0 ||½ ||½ ||½ ||1 ||x ||1 ||1 ||½ ||0 ||1 ||8½
|-
| 17 ||  ||½ ||1 ||0 ||½ ||1 ||0 ||0 ||½ ||0 ||0 ||0 ||0 ||½ ||0 ||½ ||0 ||x ||1 ||0 ||1 ||1 ||7½
|-
| 18 ||  ||0 ||0 ||0 ||½ ||1 ||½ ||½ ||0 ||½ ||0 ||½ ||½ ||½ ||0 ||0 ||0 ||0 ||x ||1 ||½ ||1 ||7
|-
| 19 ||  ||½ ||0 ||0 ||0 ||0 ||0 ||1 ||½ ||0 ||0 ||0 ||0 ||0 ||½ ||0 ||½ ||1 ||0 ||x ||1 ||1 ||6
|-
| 20 ||  ||0 ||0 ||½ ||0 ||0 ||0 ||½ ||½ ||½ ||0 ||0 ||½ ||0 ||0 ||½ ||1 ||0 ||½ ||0 ||x ||0 ||4½
|-
| 21 ||  ||0 ||0 ||0 ||0 ||0 ||0 ||0 ||0 ||0 ||0 ||0 ||½ ||0 ||½ ||0 ||0 ||0 ||0 ||0 ||1 ||x ||2
|}

1959 Candidates Tournament

The 1959 Candidates Tournament was held in Yugoslavia in Bled, Zagreb, and Belgrade. The top two players from the previous tournament, Smyslov and Keres, were seeded directly into the tournament and joined by the top six from the interzonal. Mikhail Tal won, becoming the challenger in the 1960 championship match.

The tournament was notable in that the two top finishers, Tal and Keres, scored heavily against the bottom of the field. If only scores between the top four are taken into account, the results of the top four are quite similar (Tal 5½/12, Keres 6½/12, Petrosian and Smyslov both 6/12). But Tal and Keres scored heavily against the bottom four, with Tal scoring an incredible 14½/16, including winning all four of his games against Fischer.

Future World Champion Bobby Fischer was 16 years old at the time. He was the youngest Candidate in history until Magnus Carlsen qualified for the 2007 Candidates under a different system.

{| class="wikitable" style="text-align: center;"
|+ 1959 Candidates Tournament
|-
! !! !! 1 !! 2 !! 3 !! 4 !! 5 !! 6 !! 7 !! 8 !! Score
|- style="background:#ccffcc;"
| 1 || align=left|      || xxxx || 0 0 1 0 || = = = = || 0 1 = 1 || 1 = 1 1 || 1 1 1 1 || 1 1 1 = || 1 1 1 = || 20
|-
| 2 || align=left|       || 1 1 0 1 || xxxx || 0 = = = || 1 = = 0 || = = 1 1 || 0 1 0 1 || 1 1 1 0 || 1 1 1 1 || 18½
|-
| 3 || align=left| || = = = = || 1 = = = || xxxx || = = 0 = || 0 = = 1 || 1 1 = = || 1 0 0 = || = 1 1 = || 15½
|-
| 4 || align=left|   || 1 0 = 0 || 0 = = 1 || = = 1 = || xxxx || 0 = 1 0 || = = 1 0 || = 1 = 1 || = 0 1 1 || 15
|-
| 5 || align=left|  || 0 = 0 0 || = = 0 0 || 1 = = 0 || 1 = 0 1 || xxxx || 0 1 = = || = = 1 0 || = 1 = = || 12½
|-
| 6 || align=left| || 0 0 0 0 || 1 0 1 0 || 0 0 = = || = = 0 1 || 1 0 = = || xxxx || 0 1 = 1 || = 1 = 1 || 12½
|-
| 7 || align=left|      || 0 0 0 = || 0 0 0 1 || 0 1 1 = || = 0 = 0 || = = 0 1 || 1 0 = 0 || xxxx || 0 0 = 1 || 10
|-
| 8 || align=left|Pal Benko (stateless)                         || 0 0 0 = || 0 0 0 0 || = 0 0 = || = 1 0 0 || = 0 = = || = 0 = 0 || 1 1 = 0 || xxxx || 8
|}

1960 Championship match

The best of 24 game match was held in Moscow. In the event of a 12–12 tie, Botvinnik, the title holder, would retain the Championship.

Due to Tal's less impressive results against the very top players, including his three losses to Keres in the Candidates, Botvinnik was the favourite. However Tal won the match decisively, by a margin of 4 points.

{| class="wikitable" style="text-align:center"
|+World Chess Championship Match 1960
|-
! !! 1 !! 2 !! 3 !! 4 !! 5 !! 6 !! 7 !! 8 !! 9 !! 10 !! 11 !! 12 !! 13 !! 14 !! 15 !! 16 !! 17 !! 18 !! 19 !! 20 !! 21 !! Points
|-
| align=left | 
| 1 ||style="background:black; color:white"| ½ || ½ ||style="background:black; color:white"| ½ || ½ ||style="background:black; color:white"| 1 || 1 ||style="background:black; color:white"| 0 || 0 ||style="background:black; color:white"| ½ || 1 ||style="background:black; color:white"| ½ || ½ ||style="background:black; color:white"| ½ || ½ ||style="background:black; color:white"| ½ || 1 ||style="background:black; color:white"| ½ || 1  ||style="background:black; color:white"| ½ || ½ || 12½
|-
| align=left | 
|style="background:black; color:white"| 0 || ½ ||style="background:black; color:white"| ½ || ½ ||style="background:black; color:white"| ½ || 0 ||style="background:black; color:white"| 0 || 1 ||style="background:black; color:white"| 1 || ½ ||style="background:black; color:white"| 0 || ½ ||style="background:black; color:white"| ½ || ½ ||style="background:black; color:white"| ½ || ½ ||style="background:black; color:white"| 0 || ½ ||style="background:black; color:white"| 0 || ½ ||style="background:black; color:white"| ½ ||8½
|-
|}

Game 1: Tal–Botvinnik, 1–0 

French Defence, Winawer Variation (ECO C18)1. e4 e6 2. d4 d5 3. Nc3 Bb4 4. e5 c5 5. a3 Bc3 6. bc3 Qc7 7. Qg4 f5 8. Qg3 Ne7 9. Qg7 Rg8 10. Qh7 cd4 11. Kd1 Bd7 12. Qh5 Ng6 13. Ne2 d3 14. cd3 Ba4 15. Ke1 Qe5 16. Bg5 Nc6 17. d4 Qc7 18. h4 e5 19. Rh3 Qf7 20. de5 Nce5 21. Re3 Kd7 22. Rb1 b6 23. Nf4 Rae8 24. Rb4 Bc6 25. Qd1 Nf4 26. Rf4 Ng6 27. Rd4 Re3 28. fe3 Kc7 29. c4  (diagram)  dc4 30. Bc4 Qg7 31. Bg8 Qg8 32. h5

Game 6: Botvinnik–Tal, 0–1 

Game 6 is particularly famous, thanks to a speculative knight sacrifice by Tal on move 21. The audience became so excited that the game was moved to a back room due to the noise.

King's Indian Defence, Fianchetto Variation (ECO E69)1. c4 Nf6 2. Nf3 g6 3. g3 Bg7 4. Bg2 O-O 5. d4 d6 6. Nc3 Nbd7 7. O-O e5 8. e4 c6 9. h3 Qb6 10. d5 cd5 11. cd5 Nc5 12. Ne1 Bd7 13. Nd3 Nd3 14. Qd3 Rfc8 15. Rb1 Nh5 16. Be3 Qb4 17. Qe2 Rc4 18. Rfc1 Rac8 19. Kh2 f5 20. ef5 Bf5 21. Ra1 Nf4  (diagram)  22. gf4 ef4 23. Bd2 Qb2 24. Rab1 f3 25. Rb2 fe2 26. Rb3 Rd4 27. Be1 Be5 28. Kg1 Bf4 29. Ne2 Rc1 30. Nd4 Re1 31. Bf1 Be4 32. Ne2 Be5 33. f4 Bf6 34. Rb7 Bd5 35. Rc7 Ba2 36. Ra7 Bc4 37. Ra8 Kf7 38. Ra7 Ke6 39. Ra3 d5 40. Kf2 Bh4 41. Kg2 Kd6 42. Ng3 Bg3 43. Bc4 dc4 44. Kg3 Kd5 45. Ra7 c3 46. Rc7 Kd4 47. Rd7 0–1

Game 17: Tal–Botvinnik, 1–0 

Game 17 was a 41-move win for Tal. After 12.f4, Tal (White) described the move as "memorable", and that he believed the move would throw Botvinnik off. Therefore, he believed the move could only be exploited by opening the game for Tal's bishops.

Caro-Kann Defence, Classical Variation (ECO B18)1. e4 c6 2. d4 d5 3. Nc3 de4 4. Ne4 Bf5 5. Ng3 Bg6 6. Bc4 e6 7. N1e2 Nf6 8. Nf4 Bd6 9. Ng6 hg6 10. Bg5 Nbd7 11. O-O Qa5 12. f4 O-O-O 13. a3 Qc7 14. b4 Nb6 15. Be2 Be7 16. Qd3 Nfd5 17. Be7 Qe7 18. c4 Nf6 19. Rab1 Qd7 20. Rbd1 Kb8 21. Qb3 Qc7 22. a4 Rh4 23. a5 Nc8 24. Qe3 Ne7 25. Qe5 Rhh8 26. b5 cb5 27. Qb5 a6 28. Qb2 Rd7 29. c5 Ka8 30. Bf3 Nc6 31. Bc6 Qc6 32. Rf3 Qa4 33. Rfd3 Rc8 34. Rb1 Qa5 35. Rb3 Qc7 36. Qa3 Ka7 37. Rb6 Qf4 38. Ne2 Qe4 39. Qb3 Qd5 40. Ra6 Kb8 41. Qa4 1–0

See also
 World Chess Championship 1961

Notes

References
 Tal-Botvinnik 1960, by Mikhail Tal, Russell Enterprises, 

1960
1960 in chess
1960 in Russia
1960 in Soviet sport
1958 in Yugoslav sport
1958 in chess
1959 in chess
Chess in the Soviet Union
Chess in Yugoslavia
Sports competitions in Moscow
1960 in Moscow